For the original Boomerang channel, see Boomerang (TV network).
For Boomerang in other countries, see Boomerang around the world.

Boomerang is an Italian television channel launched in 2003, which airs mostly modern cartoons aimed at preschoolers. It is a sister service of Cartoon Network, and is owned Warner Bros. Discovery under its International division.

For the most part, the network's schedule matches that of the main Boomerang in the United Kingdom and Ireland, with local scheduling variations and the dubbing/subtitling of programmes into Italian.

Programming 
Barbie Dreamhouse Adventures
Be Cool, Scooby-Doo!
Ben 10
Dino Ranch
Grizzy and the Lemmings
Kingdom Force
Justin Time
Looney Tunes Cartoons
Mighty Express
MeteoHeroes
Mighty Mike
Moley
Power Players
Simon
Scooby-Doo and Guess Who?
Taffy
The Tom and Jerry Show
Tom and Jerry in New York
Thomas and Friends
''Zouk

History 
The channel launched exclusively on Sky Italia on 31 July 2003, airing the classic Hanna-Barbera cartoons such as Courage the Cowardly Dog, Johnny Bravo, The Flintstones and many other classics, taken directly from the Cartoon Network schedule.

From 20 December 2008 on channel 610 of Sky, along with Cartoon Network, the channel Boomerang +1 launched, airing the same schedule as Boomerang just one hour behind. From 20 December 2013 due to frequency changes the channel began to air in the 14:9 ratio, and from 16 September 2015 along with the original feed it switched to 16:9.

On 2 February 2015 it rebranded to the new logo.

Boomerang +1 
Boomerang +1 is a timeshift channel launched on 20 December 2008 that airs the same schedule as Boomerang, just one hour behind. The channel also usually temporarily rebrands to special programmings dedicated to classic shows.

Logos

References

External links
  

Boomerang (TV network)
Television channels in Italy
Italian-language television stations
Television channels and stations established in 2003
Warner Bros. Discovery EMEA